Carlos Loriente (born 27 July 1978) is a Spanish rower. He competed in the men's lightweight coxless four event at the 2004 Summer Olympics.

References

1978 births
Living people
Spanish male rowers
Olympic rowers of Spain
Rowers at the 2004 Summer Olympics
Sportspeople from Lugo